Nebine is a rural locality in the Shire of Paroo, Queensland, Australia. In the  Nebine had a population of 19 people.

Geography 
The Balonne Highway passes from east to west through the centre of the locality with a junction to the Balonne Charleville Road which exits the locality in the north.

The locality is flat (about 190 metres above sea level). Nebine Creek flows from north to south through the locality.

History 
The locality was officially named and bounded by the Minister for Natural Resources and Minister for Mines 20 July 2001.

In the  Nebine had a population of 19 people.

References

External links 

Shire of Paroo
Localities in Queensland